Native Son is a 1940 novel by Richard Wright.

Native Son(s) may also refer to:

Film and theatre

Adaptations of Richard Wright's novel 
 Native Son (play), a 1941 Broadway drama
 Native Son (1951 film), an Argentine film directed by Pierre Chenal
 Native Son (1986 film), an American film directed by Jerrold Freedman
 Native Son (2019 film), an American film directed by Rashid Johnson

Other works 
 Native Son (2010 film), a British film from Scotland, written and directed by Scott Graham

Music 
 Native Son (band), a Japanese jazz band
 Native Son (album), or the title song, by the Judybats, 1991
 Native Sons (Loggins and Messina album), or the title song, "Native Son", 1976
 Native Sons (The Long Ryders album), 1984
 Native Sons (Los Lobos album), 2021
 "Native Son", a song by Alter Bridge from Walk the Sky
 "Native Son", a song by Bryan Adams from Into the Fire
 "Native Son", a song by James Taylor from New Moon Shine
 "Native Son", a song by U2 from Unreleased and Rare

Sports 
 Native Sons (lacrosse), an American and Iroquois box lacrosse team
 Nickel Centre Native Sons, a Canadian junior A ice hockey team 1976–1986
 Toronto Native Sons, a Canadian junior ice hockey team 1933–1942

See also 
 Native Sons of Canada, a Canadian nativist group
 Native Sons of the Golden West, a Californian group
 From a Native Son, a book by Ward Churchill